The Pisco Formation is a geologic formation located in Peru, on the southern coastal desert of Ica and Arequipa. The tuffaceous sandstones, diatomaceous siltstones, conglomerates and dolomites were deposited in a lagoonal to near-shore environment, in bays similar to other Pacific South American formations as the Bahía Inglesa and Coquimbo Formations of Chile.

Several specialists consider the Pisco Formation one of the most important Lagerstätten, based on the large amount of exceptionally preserved marine fossils, including sharks (most notably megalodon), penguins, whales, dolphins, birds, marine crocodiles and aquatic giant sloths.

Famous fossils found in these layers include the giant raptorial sperm whale Livyatan, the aquatic sloth Thalassocnus, the sperm whale Acrophyseter, and the walrus-like dolphin Odobenocetops.

Description 
The Pisco Formation of the Pisco Basin consists of tuffaceous sandstones, diatomaceous yellow to gray siltstones and a basal conglomerate. The formation is deposited from Pisco in the north to Yauca in the south. The northern portion is known as the Ocucaje Area and the southern part as the Sacaco Area. The formation unconformably overlies the Chilcatay and Caballas Formations.

Fauna 
The Pisco Formation has provided a rich resource of marine fauna, including marine mammals like cetaceans and seals, large fishes, reptiles, and penguins. It is also one of the richest sites in the world for fossil cetaceans, with close to 500 examples being found in the formation.

The oldest fossils of the aquatic sloth Thalassocnus (T. antiquus) come from the Aguada de Lomas horizon of the Pisco Formation and were dated at roughly 7 Ma. The youngest specimen (T. carolomartini) was found in the Sacaco horizon and dated to approximately 3 Ma. Thalassocnus was preyed upon by the probable apex predators of the environment, Livyatan and megalodon. The youngest strata belonging to the formation have been dated at 2 Ma, corresponding to the Early Pleistocene (Uquian). Fossils of the Humboldt penguin were found in these deposits at the Yauca locality.

Vertebrates

Invertebrates

Correlations

Laventan

See also 
 Castilletes Formation, contemporaneous fossiliferous formation of the Cocinetas Basin, Colombia
 Cerro Ballena, contemporaneous fossil site of the Bahía Inglesa Formation of Chile
 Collón Curá Formation, contemporaneous fossiliferous formation of Patagonia, Argentina
 Honda Group, contemporaneous fossiliferous formation of Colombia
 Navidad Formation, contemporaneous fossiliferous formation of Chile
 Pebas Formation, contemporaneous fossiliferous formation of the Amazon Basin
 Urumaco, contemporaneous fossil site of the Falcón Basin, Venezuela

References

Bibliography

Further reading 

 A. Alván, J. Apolín, and C. Chacaltana. 2004. Los dientes de Seláceos (Condrichthyies) y su aplicación estratigráfica en Las Lomas de Ullujaya (Ica, Perú). XIII Congreso Peruano de Geología. Resúmenes Extendidos 595-598
 A. Collareta, O. Lambert, W. Landini, C. Di Celma, E. Malinverno, R. Varas-Malca, M. Urbina and G. Bianucci. 2017. Did the giant extinct shark Carcharocles megalodon target small prey? Bite marks on marine mammal remains from the late Miocene of Peru. Palaeogeography, Palaeoclimatology, Palaeoecology 469:84-91
 R. Esperante, L. Brand, K. E. Nick, O. Poma, and M. Urbina. 2008. Exceptional occurrence of fossil baleen in shallow marine sediments of the Neogene Pisco Formation, Southern Peru. Palaeogeography, Palaeoclimatology, Palaeoecology 257:344-360
 A. Gioncada, A. Collareta, K. Gariboldi, O. Lambert, C. Di Clema, E. Bonaccorsi, M. Urbina and G. Bianucci. 2016. Inside baleen: Exceptional microstructure preservation in a late Miocene whale skeleton from Peru. Geology
 C. S. Gutstein, M. A. Cozzuol, A. O. Vargas, M. E. Suarez, C. L. Schultz and D. Rubilar-Rogers. 2009. Patterns of skull variation of Brachydelphis (Cetacea, Odontoceti) from the Neogene of the Southeastern Pacific. Journal of Mammalogy 90(2):504-519
 O. Lambert, A. Collareta, W. Landini, K. Post, B. Ramanssamy, C. Di Celma, M. Urbina and G. Bianucci. 2015. No deep diving: evidence of predation on epipelagic fish for a stem beaked whale from the Late Miocene of Peru. Proceedings of the Royal Society B 282:20151530
 J. Machare, T. DeVries, and E. Fourtanier. 1988. Oligo-Miocene transgression along the Pacific margin of South America: new paleontological and geological evidence from the Pisco basin (Peru). Géodyynamique 3(1-2):25-37
 R. Marocco and C. de Muizon. 1988. Los vertebrados del Neogeno de La Costa Sur del Perú: Ambiente sedimentario y condiciones de fosilización. Bulletin de l'Institut Français d'Études Andines 17(2):105-117
 C. de Muizon and D. P. Domning. 1985. The first records of fossil sirenians in the southeastern Pacific Ocean. Bulletin du Museum National d'Histoire Naturelle. Section C: Sciences de la Terre: Paléontologie, Géologie, Minéralogie, Paris: Muséum National d'Histoire Naturelle 7(3):189-213
 C. de Muizon. 1983. Pliopontos littoralis un nouveau Platanistidae Cetacea du Pliocene de la cote peruvienne. Comptes Rendus de l'Académie des Sciences Paris Série II (296)1101-1104
 C. de Muizon. 1978. Arctocephalus (Hydrarctos) lomasiensis, subgen. nov. et nov sp., un nouvel Otariidae du Mio-Pliocene de Sacaco. Bulletin de l'Institute Français d'Études Andines 7(3-4):169-189
 M. Urbina and M. Stucchi. 2005. Los cormoranes (Aves: Phalacrocoracidae) del Mio-Plioceno de la Formacion Pisco, Peru. Boletin de la Sociedad Geologica del Peru 99:41-49
 R. M. Varas Malca and A. Valenzuela Toro. 2011. A basal monachine seal from the middle Miocene of the Pisco Formation, Peru. Ameghiniana 48(4):R216-R217
 T. J. DeVries. 2008. Pliocene and Pleistocene Fissurella Bruguiére, 1789 (Gastropoda: Fissurellidae) from Southern Peru. The Veliger 50(2):129-148
 T. J. DeVries. 2007. Cenozoic Turritellidae (Gastropoda) from southern Peru. Journal of Paleontology 81(2):331-351
 T. J. DeVries, L. T. Groves, and M. Urbina. 2006. A new early Miocene Muracypraea Woodring, 1957 (Gastropoda: Cypraeidae) from the Pisco Basin of southern Peru. The Nautilus 120(3):101-105
 T. J. DeVries. 2003. Acanthina Fischer von Waldheim, 1807 (Gastropoda: Muricidae), an ocenebrine genus endemic to South America. The Veliger 46(4):332-350
 T. J. DeVries. 1997. Neogene Ficus (Mesogastropoda: Ficidae) from the Pisco Basin (Peru). Boletín de la Sociedad Geológica de Perú 86:11-18

 
Geologic formations of Peru
Miocene Series of South America
Pliocene Series of South America
Pleistocene Peru
Neogene Peru
Uquian
Chapadmalalan
Montehermosan
Huayquerian
Chasicoan
Mayoan
Laventan
Colloncuran
Sandstone formations
Siltstone formations
Conglomerate formations
Dolomite formations
Tuff formations
Lagoonal deposits
Tidal deposits
Shallow marine deposits
Paleontology in Peru
Formations
Formations